The 2020 Summer Olympics, officially known as the "Games of the XXXII Olympiad", was an international multi-sport event  held in Tokyo, Japan, from 23 July to 8 August 2021.  Originally scheduled to take place from 24 July to 9 August 2020, it was postponed in March 2020 as a result of the COVID-19 pandemic, and was held largely behind closed doors with no spectators permitted under the state of emergency. Despite being rescheduled for 2021, the event retains the Tokyo 2020 name for marketing and branding purposes.

The 2020 Summer Paralympics followed two weeks later between 25 August and 5 September 2021.

Venues and infrastructure

In February 2012, it was announced that former Tokyo's National Stadium, the central venue for the 1964 Summer Olympics, would undergo a ¥100 billion renovation for the 2019 Rugby World Cup and the 2020 Summer Olympics. In November 2012, the Japan Sport Council announced it was taking bids for proposed stadium designs. Of the 46 finalists, Zaha Hadid Architects was awarded the project, which would replace the old stadium with a new 80,000-seat stadium. There was criticism of the Zaha Hadid design—which was compared to a bicycle helmet and regarded as clashing with the surrounding Meiji Shrine—and widespread disapproval of the costs, even with attempts to revise and "optimize" the design.

In June 2015, the government announced it was planning to reduce the new stadium's permanent capacity to 65,000 in its athletics configuration (although with the option to add up to 15,000 temporary seats for football) as a further cost-saving measure. The original plans to build a retractable roof were also scrapped. As a result of public opposition to the increasing costs of the stadium, which reached ¥252 billion, the government ultimately chose to reject Zaha Hadid's design entirely and selected a new design by Japanese architect Kengo Kuma. Inspired by traditional temples and with a lower profile, Kuma's design had a budget of ¥149 billion. Changes in plans prevented the new stadium from being completed in time for the 2019 Rugby World Cup as originally intended. National Stadium was inaugurated on 21 December 2019 and is named Olympic Stadium during 2020 Olympic Games.

Of the 33 competition venues in Tokyo, 28 are within  of the Olympic Village, with eleven new venues which were constructed. On 16 October 2019, the IOC announced that there were plans to re-locate the marathon and racewalking events to Sapporo for heat concerns. The plans were made official on 1 November 2019 after Tokyo Governor Yuriko Koike accepted the IOC's decision, despite her belief that the events should have remained in Tokyo.

Heritage Zone 
Six venues for eight sports are located within the central business area of Tokyo, northwest of the Olympic Village. Three of these venues were originally constructed for the 1964 Summer Olympics.

*Built on the site of the old National Stadium (used for the 1964 Summer Olympics)
†Originally constructed for the 1964 Summer Olympics

Tokyo Bay Zone 
There are 13 venues planned for 15 sports located in the vicinity of Tokyo Bay, southeast of the Olympic Village, predominantly on Ariake, Odaiba and the surrounding artificial islands. The flame cauldron will be installed at Tokyo Waterfront City on Ariake West Canal.

Outlying venues 

Football venues

Non-competition venues

Notes

References

 
venues
2020
2020 Summer Paralympics